Smak is the eponymous debut studio album by the Serbian  band Smak, released in 1975 by ZKP RTLJ.

Track listing

Personnel 
Smak
 Boris Aranđelović — vocals
 Radomir Mihajlović "Točak" — acoustic guitar, electric guitar, backing vocals
 Laza Ristovski — keyboards, organ, electric piano, synthesizer, mellotron
 Zoran Milanović — bass guitar
 Slobodan Stojanović "Kepa" — drums, congas, gong

Additional personnel
 Ljubomir Milojević — design
 Drago Hribovšek — engineer
 Peter Čanžek — assistant engineer
 Ivo Umek — production

References

External links 

Smak albums
1975 debut albums
Serbian-language albums
ZKP RTLJ albums
Albums recorded in Slovenia